Jack Salvatore Jr. (born October 16, 1989) is an American writer, ghostwriter, and actor. He is best known for his role as Mark Del Figgalo on Zoey 101.

Career
Salvatore appeared in the 2001 film Donnie Darko, and has guest starred in several television shows, including Judging Amy, That '70s Show, and Still Standing.  He is known for his recurring role as Mark Del Figgalo in the Nickelodeon/Family television series Zoey 101 where he appeared in 28 episodes. Salvatore appeared on How I Met Your Mother and had a small role in the Owen Wilson feature Drillbit Taylor.

In the alternate opening and the alternate ending to 13 Going on 30 (2004), Salvatore played young Matt Flamhaff. These alternate clips can be seen on the special features on the DVD. He appeared in an episode of Mind of Mencia and The Secret Life of the American Teenager, and has a recurring role on 10 Things I Hate About You. He also guest starred in the TV show Victorious as the pajelehoocho commercial boy in the episode 'Victori-Yes.'
He also worked as the writer's production assistant on shows like Victorious and Sam & Cat.

On January 12, 2023, Jamie Lynn Spears announced that production had begun on a sequel film entitled, Zoey 102, set to premiere in 2023 on Paramount+, with original series cast members Spears, Salvatore Jr., Sean Flynn, Christopher Massey, Erin Sanders, and Matthew Underwood reprising their roles from Zoey 101. Production began in January 2023 in North Carolina. Nancy Hower is currently attached to direct, with  Spears attached as executive producer.

Filmography

Television

Personal life
Salvatore Jr. began dating Christine Pemberton in 2015. They married in February 2021 after 6 years of dating. They have one child, a daughter, who was born in 2022.

References

External links

1989 births
Male actors from Los Angeles
American male child actors
American male film actors
American male television actors
Living people